The Economic Warfare Division (E.W.D.)  was a division of the Admiralty Naval Staff established during world war two it was in operation from September 1939 to July 1945.    The staff division was administered by the Director of Economic Warfare Division.

History
The division was first established in 1939  its responsibilities involved formulating strategies in relation to Economic Warfare and devising plans in order to implement effective economic blockading of Germany. The division worked in liaison with the Ministry of Economic Warfare. It was in operation throughout the second world war and by 1946 it was abolished. The division was administered by the Director Economic Warfare.

Directors of Economic Warfare Division
Included:
 Captain O. E. Halifax, 1 September 1939 - October 1944.

References

E
Military units and formations established in 1939
Military units and formations disestablished in 1945